Vadimovo is a rural locality (a selo) in Chigirinsky Selsoviet of Blagoveshchensky District, Amur Oblast, Russia. The population was 2 as of 2018.

Geography 
The village is located on the left bank of the Amur River, km southeast of Blagoveshchensk (the district's administrative centre) by road.

References 

Rural localities in Blagoveshchensky District, Amur Oblast